is a former professional boxer and former WBA and lineal super featherweight champion. He is one of the few Japanese boxers to have won the world title fighting outside Japan.

Biography 
Uehara was born in Naha, Okinawa. He won the inter-high school boxing tournament in his senior year in high school, and moved on to Nihon University, where he won amateur titles in two weight classes, compiling a distinguished amateur record of 117–8 (87RSC). He was already touted as the next Japanese world champion when he announced his decision to turn professional.

Uehara made his debut on November 14, 1972, with a fourth-round knockout in Honolulu, Hawaii. He suffered his first professional loss in his second fight. He returned to Japan after five fights in the United States.

He won nine fights in a row after returning to Japan, including seven victories by knockout. Uehara returned to the United States in August, 1974 to challenge WBA super featherweight champion Ben Villaflor, but lost by second-round knockout.

Uehara won the Japanese super featherweight title on July 21, 1971, knocking out his opponent in the first round. He defended the title a total of ten times, a considerable number of defenses for a regional title.

Uehara was once again ranked as the number one WBA super featherweight challenger in 1980, and challenged Samuel Serrano for the Lineal and WBA super featherweight titles on the undercard of Thomas Hearns' win over José Cuevas in Detroit. Uehara was losing on all three judges' scorecards before connecting with a right hook to knock out the defending champion in the sixth round. Uehara's victory was named The Ring's 1980 upset of the year.

Uehara defended his title in November 1980, before meeting Serrano for the second time in April 1981. He lost the rematch by unanimous decision, and announced his retirement shortly afterwards. His record was 27-5-0 (21KOs).

Professional boxing record

See also
List of super featherweight boxing champions
List of WBA world champions
List of Japanese boxing world champions
Boxing in Japan

References

External links 
 
Yasutsune Uehara - CBZ Profile

1949 births
Living people
People from Naha
World boxing champions
Nihon University alumni
Asian Games medalists in boxing
Boxers at the 1970 Asian Games
Japanese male boxers
Asian Games bronze medalists for Japan
Medalists at the 1970 Asian Games
Super-featherweight boxers